The 2001 season was the New England Patriots' 32nd in the National Football League (NFL) and their 42nd season overall. They finished with an 11–5 record and a division title before advancing to and winning Super Bowl XXXVI.

Coming off a fifth-place finish in the AFC East during head coach Bill Belichick's first season in 2000, the Patriots were not expected to fare much better in 2001. On August 6, quarterbacks coach Dick Rehbein died of cardiomyopathy at the age of 45. In the second game of the regular season, nine-year starting quarterback Drew Bledsoe, who had received a 10-year contract extension in March, was injured on a hit by New York Jets linebacker Mo Lewis, causing backup Tom Brady, a sixth-round draft pick in 2000, to enter the game after serving as the Patriots' 4th string rookie the season before. The Patriots lost the game to fall to 0–2, but Brady started the final 14 games of the season and compiled an 11–3 record as a starter, helping the Patriots clinch the 2nd seed in the AFC playoffs and a first round bye. As a result, the Patriots became the first team in NFL history to win the Super Bowl after starting the season 1–3, and only the 2nd team in NFL history to win the Super Bowl after starting the season 2–3, after the 1980 Oakland Raiders.

With the second seed in the AFC playoffs, the Patriots faced the Oakland Raiders at home following a first-round bye in the final game at Foxboro Stadium; in a snowstorm, a Patriots drive late in the fourth quarter was kept alive in an application of the now-infamous tuck rule that was used in overturning a Brady fumble into an incomplete pass. Shortly after, a 45-yard Adam Vinatieri field goal through the snow, considered one of the most clutch field goals in NFL history, sent the game into overtime, when Vinatieri scored another field goal to win the game. After defeating the top-seeded Pittsburgh Steelers in the AFC Championship Game, the Patriots faced the heavily favored St. Louis Rams, known as "The Greatest Show on Turf", in Super Bowl XXXVI. Once again, Vinatieri kicked a game-winning field goal; the 48-yard kick sailed through the uprights as time expired, and gave the Patriots their first ever Super Bowl victory in what has been considered by many to be a "Cinderella" season. 

The 2001 season served as a launching pad for the team. Over the next eighteen seasons, they would win sixteen more division titles, eight more AFC Championships in twelve appearances, five more Super Bowl titles in eight appearances, and achieve an undefeated regular season in 2007.

Offseason

2001 NFL draft

Staff

Roster

Opening training camp roster
At the time of the first public training camp practice at Bryant College on July 26, they had the NFL maximum of 80 players signed to their roster. The Patriots received seven roster exemptions for the NFL Europe allocations of Michael Bishop, Brad Costello, Tony George, Sean Morey, Josh Rawlings, Kato Serwanga, and Tony Simmons. Additionally, the Patriots allocated wide receiver Tony Hamler and linebackers John Eskridge and Marc Megna to NFL Europe and received roster exemptions for them, but those players were waived before the start of training camp. Finally, injured draft pick Brock Williams had not yet signed a contract at the start of camp and did not count against the roster limit.

Week 1 roster

Final roster

Schedule

Preseason

Regular season

Postseason

Season summary

Week 1: at Cincinnati Bengals

The season got off to a discouraging start as the Patriots visited Paul Brown Stadium and were beaten by the Bengals 23–17, surrendering 361 yards of offense, 104 of them on the ground by Corey Dillon.  Drew Bledsoe failed to complete a pass in the game's final two minutes; he also failed earlier in the game on a quarterback sneak on fourth down.

Week 2: vs. New York Jets

This was the first game played by any team since the September 11 attacks. During the fourth quarter of a 10–3 loss to the Jets, Bledsoe was hit hard while running to the sidelines by Jets linebacker Mo Lewis.  The injury to his chest would send Bledsoe to the hospital following the game.  Tom Brady substituted for Bledsoe following the collision, completing five of ten passes for 46 yards, and was elevated to starter for the following week. During the game, the Jets appeared to lose a fumble to the Patriots, but the fumble was reversed based on a rule that would become controversial in the subsequent playoffs – the Tuck Rule.

Week 3: vs. Indianapolis Colts

The 2–0 Colts were crushed 44–13 following a brutal hit on receiver Jerome Pathon by Patriots linebacker Bryan Cox in the first quarter. From there Colts receivers shied away from contact with Patriot defenders and Peyton Manning's pass from the Patriots 22-yard line late in the first half was intercepted by Otis Smith and returned for a touchdown. The Patriots led 23–0 late in the third quarter before Manning ran in a ten-yard score, then in the fourth the Colts collapsed entirely, surrendering 21 points (including a 23-yard Ty Law interception return touchdown) while managing just a touchdown to future Patriot Marcus Pollard. Tom Brady threw for 168 yards in his first start. This was the first matchup of the storied Tom Brady–Peyton Manning rivalry that lasted for the next 15 years.

Week 4: at Miami Dolphins

The Patriots scored first on Antowain Smith's 9-yard running touchdown before the Dolphins tied it up. Miami then took a 10–7 lead in the second quarter, before Adam Vinatieri kicked a 37 yard field goal to tie it. However, the Dolphins then retook the lead at 16–10 and shut down the Patriots offense the rest of the way and New England went on to lose 30–10, which made their record 1–3.

Week 5: vs. San Diego Chargers

The game that decisively turned the 1–3 Patriots season around came against former and future Patriot Doug Flutie along with the 3–1 Chargers' vaunted rookie LaDainian Tomlinson.  Unruly receiver Terry Glenn, making his first start of the season after being benched for the opening four games, caught a 21-yard score from Tom Brady and had seven catches for 110 yards total.  The Patriots led 16–13 but were struggling on special teams (Bill Belichick said, "That's the worst we've played in the kicking game in a year and a half"); Adam Vinatieri had missed a field goal try and the extra point off Glenn's touchdown, but the real special teams breakdown occurred with less than seven minutes remaining; forced to punt with his team trailing 19–16, Patriots punter Lee Johnson botched the kick and running back Derrick Harris ran in a six-yard score (the miscue cost Johnson his punting job as he was replaced by Ken Walter). But despite being down 26–16, Brady took over, directing a field goal drive, then throwing the game-tying touchdown in the final minute to Jermaine Wiggins.  A last-second Wade Richey field goal try fell short, and in overtime Brady picked up a Chargers blitz and led a drive that ended in Vinatieri's 44-yard field goal and a 29–26 Patriots final.

Week 6: at Indianapolis Colts

In what turned out to be their last trip to the RCA Dome until the post-realignment 2003 season, the Patriots followed up their September rout of the Colts with a 38–17 thrashing highlighted by the one-man scoring explosion of David Patten, who ran in a 29-yard touchdown following the return of a blocked Mike Vanderjagt kick, caught a 91-yard bomb from Tom Brady, then on a flea-flick play threw a 60-yard strike to Troy Brown, all in the first half.  Despite outgaining the Patriots in total yards (484 to 385) the Colts lost two fumbles, saw two Mike Vanderjagt field goal attempts blocked (the second came at the end of the first quarter), and Peyton Manning was sacked four times as the Colts' season began spiraling into collapse.

Week 7: at Denver Broncos

The Patriots led 17–10 at halftime against the Broncos. However, the Broncos came back and held the Patriots to just three points in the second half and handed the Patriots their fourth loss of the year. Tom Brady threw an interception for the first time his career, which ended a streak of 162 consecutive pass attempts without an interception thrown.

Week 8: at Atlanta Falcons

Former Patriot Shawn Jefferson caught a 19-yard touchdown from Chris Chandler, but Chandler was sacked six times and knocked out of the game; rookie Michael Vick threw for 56 yards and rushed for 50 more but was sacked three times. The most bizarre score of the game came in the third as a Tom Brady pass for David Patten was deflected by Ashley Ambrose and caught at the 30-yard line by Troy Brown for a 44-yard touchdown; Belichick and Brown compared the play to The Immaculate Reception, as did the CBS telecasting crew. The Patriots won 24–10.

Week 9: vs. Buffalo Bills

The Patriots were up 7–3 at halftime against the Bills, and went on to win 21–11 as the New England defense held the Bills to eight points in the second half.

Week 10: vs. St. Louis Rams

The Patriots squandered a goalline opportunity when they fumbled to the Rams late in the second quarter; the Rams drove downfield and scored. The Patriots' defense was unable to stop Kurt Warner and get the ball back late in the game, as the Rams salted away a 24–17 win. The win proved costly, as five Rams starters were knocked out of the game, and coach Mike Martz prophetically said afterward that the Patriots were a Super Bowl-caliber team. Oddly enough, this was the last loss for the Patriots during the 2001 season.

Week 11: vs. New Orleans Saints

Drew Bledsoe was medically cleared to return to the field, but Bill Belichick ruled that Brady would remain the starter. Brady responded with four touchdowns in a 34–17 triumph. Ricky Williams, soon to leave the Saints for the Miami Dolphins, rushed for 56 yards and a touchdown in his first encounter with the Patriots.

Week 12: at New York Jets

The Jets bullied the Patriots en route to a 13–0 halftime lead, but the Patriots stormed back, scoring 14 third-quarter points en route to a 17–16 win.

Week 13: vs. Cleveland Browns

The  Browns held a 10–3 lead after one quarter, but the Patriots were able to rally for 24 points in the final three quarters as the defense held the Browns to just six points in the second half as New England improved their record to 8–5.

Week 14: at Buffalo Bills

Field goals ruled the day as the Buffalo Bills' Shayne Graham and the Patriots' Adam Vinatieri kicked seven combined in a 12–9 overtime Patriots win. The most controversial play came in overtime when David Patten caught a pass and was knocked out of bounds; the ball bounced off his feet and was recovered by the Bills, but the play went to review and referee Mike Carey determined that Patten, momentarily unconscious, had his head out of bounds when the ball touched his feet; by rule the ball was dead. The Patriots thus retained possession enough for the game-winning 23-yard field goal.

Week 15: vs. Miami Dolphins

The Patriots defeated the Dolphins 20–13 for the first time since November 23, 1998 in the final regular season game for Foxboro Stadium. During halftime, Patriot greats of the past and present were paraded with each commemorating a season of the stadium's 31-season existence – John Hannah represented 1973 (the year he was drafted by New England), Steve Grogan represented 1976 (the year of the infamous "Ben Dreith game" against Oakland), Drew Bledsoe represented 1996 (the Super Bowl XXXI season), and so forth. During the game itself, Tom Brady caught a 23-yard pass from Kevin Faulk and threw for 109 yards himself, as the Patriots raced out to an early lead and held off a late Dolphins rally to earn sole 1st place in the AFC East.

Week 17: at Carolina Panthers

After the bye week, in the final regular season game, the Patriots beat the Panthers 38–6 and finished the regular season with an 11–5 record as they clinched the AFC East and a first round bye.

Standings

Postseason results

AFC Divisional Playoffs: vs. (3) Oakland Raiders

The game, the final one in the history of Foxboro Stadium, played in a heavy snowfall, will be remembered for a call near the end of the game, in which the referees initially ruled that New England quarterback Tom Brady had fumbled on a pass attempt, with Oakland protecting a three-point lead. Invoking the "tuck rule", where a ball is ruled an incomplete pass after the quarterback starts any forward motion, the referee overturned the decision after reviewing the instant replay, calling the drop an incomplete pass rather than a fumble.

Both teams struggled in the heavy snow storm during the first half, combining for the same number of punts as first downs (11) and converting only one of 13 third downs. However, Raiders quarterback Rich Gannon was efficient, completing 10 of 14 passes for 87 yards, including a 13-yard touchdown pass to James Jett early in the second quarter.

In the second half, things began to open up, especially for New England, who almost completely abandoned their running game and relied on Brady. He ended up completing 26 of 39 passes for 238 yards in the second half. On the opening drive of the third quarter, he led the Patriots 62 yards in 12 plays to the Raiders' 5-yard line, where Adam Vinatieri made a 23-yard field goal to cut the score, 7–3. Oakland responded with a 10-play, 43-yard drive, and scored a 38-yard field goal from Sebastian Janikowski. Then after forcing a punt, a 22-yard reception by receiver Jerry Rice set up Janikowski's second field goal, giving the Raiders a 13–3 lead with 2 minutes left in the third quarter.

In the fourth quarter, Brady led the Patriots on a 10-play, 67-yard drive, completing 9 consecutive passes for 61 yards and finishing it with a 6-yard touchdown run. Later in the quarter, the infamous "tuck" incident occurred. As Brady dropped back to pass, he lost the ball while being tackled by former college teammate Charles Woodson, and Oakland linebacker Greg Biekert recovered it with 1:43 left. However, an instant replay challenge caused referee Walt Coleman to overturn the fumble, ruling Brady's arm had been moving forward while being tackled and making the play an incomplete pass. Taking advantage of his second chance, Brady led the Patriots inside the Raiders' 30-yard line where Vinatieri made a 45-yard field goal with 27 seconds left, a dramatic kick through heavy snowfall that barely cleared the crossbar, sending the game into overtime.

New England won the coin toss and drove for the winning field goal on a possession that featured a risky fourth down and 4 conversion attempt from Brady, who threw a 6-yard pass to David Patten at the Raiders' 22-yard line to keep the drive alive. While Vinatieri's game-tying kick had the wind at his back, this drive was into the wind and the Patriots wanted to move closer. Following five runs from Antowain Smith and one from Brady, and after a drive of more than eight minutes, Vinatieri and holder Ken Walter cleared snow away from where the ball would be spotted. Vinatieri then gave New England its first lead of the game, making a 23-yard field goal to win.

AFC Championship Game: at (1) Pittsburgh Steelers

The Patriots' storybook season continued as Drew Bledsoe came into the game in the second quarter in place of an injured Tom Brady – who replaced Bledsoe himself early in the season when he suffered a sheared blood vessel.   The game was officiated by Ed Hochuli and the frequency of penalties in the game was criticized by both teams and by some media afterward.

Patriots receiver Troy Brown opened up the scoring with a 55-yard punt return touchdown with 3:42 left in the first quarter. Pittsburgh responded by driving 65 yards in 10 plays and scoring with a 30-yard field goal from Kris Brown. Later in the quarter, Brady completed a 28-yard pass to Brown at the Steelers 40-yard line, but was knocked out of the game on the play. Bledsoe took over without missing a beat, rushing for four yards and completing three passes to David Patten for 37 yards, the last one an 11-yard touchdown to give the Patriots a 14–3 lead.

On the first drive of the second half, New England linebacker Tedy Bruschi recovered a fumbled snap on the Steelers 35-yard line. But the Patriots gained only two yards on their next 4 plays and ended up turning the ball over on downs. Pittsburgh subsequently drove 52 yards to the 16-yard line to set up Brown's second field goal attempt, but this time his kick was blocked by defensive tackle Brandon Mitchell and Troy Brown recovered the ball. After returning it 11 yards, Brown threw a lateral pass to Antwan Harris, who took the ball the remaining 45 yards for a touchdown to increase New England's lead to 21–3.

The Steelers struck back with quarterback Kordell Stewart completing a 24-yard pass to Hines Ward and a 19-yard screen pass to Amos Zereoué on an 8-play, 79-yard drive. Jerome Bettis finished it off with a 1-yard touchdown run, cutting the score to 21–10 with 5:11 left in the third quarter. New England was forced to punt after linebacker Jason Gildon sacked Bledsoe on third down, and Troy Edwards returned the punt 28 yards to the Patriots 32-yard line. Five plays later, Zereoue scored with an 11-yard touchdown run, making the score 21–17.

Early in the fourth quarter, Adam Vinatieri's 44-yard field goal increased New England's lead to 24–17. Later in the period, the Patriots made two key stops to clinch the victory. First, safety Tebucky Jones intercepted a pass from Stewart and returned it 19 yards to the Steelers 34-yard line. Pittsburgh's defense managed to prevent a first down and Vinatieri missed a 50-yard field goal attempt that would have sealed the game, giving the Steelers the ball back on their own 40-yard line, but a few plays later, Lawyer Milloy intercepted a pass from Stewart with 2:02 left to seal the game, and the Patriots were able to run out the rest of the clock.

The win was the 300th career victory, encompassing the regular season and postseason, in Patriots franchise history.

Super Bowl XXXVI vs. (N1) St. Louis Rams

The Rams scored first midway through the first quarter, driving 48 yards in 10 plays to set up a 50-yard field goal by kicker Jeff Wilkins. At the time, the field goal was the third longest in Super Bowl history. The rest of the quarter was scoreless.

Early in the second quarter, the Rams drove to New England's 34-yard line, but quarterback Kurt Warner threw an incompletion on third down, and Wilkins' subsequent 52-yard field goal attempt sailed wide left.

With 8:49 left in the second quarter, New England cornerback Ty Law intercepted a pass intended for receiver Isaac Bruce and scored on a 47-yard return to give the Patriots a 7–3 lead. With less than two minutes left in the first half, Warner completed a pass to receiver Ricky Proehl at the Patriots 40-yard line, but New England defensive back Antwan Harris forced a fumble while tackling him, which was recovered by Patriots defensive back Terrell Buckley. New England quarterback Tom Brady would lead a drive that culminated with an 8-yard touchdown pass to receiver David Patten with 31 seconds left in the half to give New England a 14–3 halftime lead. This was the first time in the 2001 season that St. Louis fell behind in a game by more than eight points.

The Patriots took the opening kickoff of the second half, but could only reach the St. Louis 43-yard line before being forced to punt. Aided by a 20-yard reception by wide receiver Az-Zahir Hakim, a 22-yard reception by Bruce, and a defensive pass interference penalty on Patriots defensive back Otis Smith, the Rams advanced to the New England 41-yard line. However, on the next play, linebacker Mike Vrabel and defensive lineman Richard Seymour sacked Warner for a 9-yard loss. Warner then threw 2 consecutive incomplete passes, which resulted in the Rams punting.

Later in the third quarter, Otis Smith intercepted a pass intended for Rams wide receiver Torry Holt after Holt slipped while coming off the line of scrimmage, and returned the ball 30 yards to the Rams 33-yard line. Though St. Louis' defense did not give up a touchdown to the Patriots, kicker Adam Vinatieri made a 37-yard field goal to increase New England's lead to 17–3.

The Rams responded by driving to the Patriots' 3-yard line on their ensuing drive. On fourth-and-goal, the Rams attempted to score a touchdown, calling for a quarterback sneak by Warner. Warner fumbled the ball while being tackled by linebacker Roman Phifer, which was recovered by defensive back Tebucky Jones who returned it 97 yards for a touchdown that would have increased the Patriots lead to 23–3. However, the play was nullified by a holding penalty on linebacker Willie McGinest, which in turn gave the Rams a first down on the 1-yard line instead. On second down, Warner scored on a 2-yard touchdown run to make the score 17–10, Patriots.

After Warner's touchdown, the Rams defense forced the Patriots to a three-and-out. St. Louis then drove from their own 7-yard line to the New England 36-yard line, aided by a 30-yard reception by Proehl. However, McGinest sacked Warner for a 16-yard loss on second down, pushing the Rams back to their 46-yard line. St. Louis ended up punting after Warner's third down pass was incomplete.

The Rams forced New England to another three-and-out, and got the ball back on their own 45-yard line with 1:51 left in the game. Warner threw three consecutive completions: an 18-yard pass to Hakim, an 11-yard one to receiver Yo Murphy, and finally a 26-yard touchdown completion to Proehl that tied the game 17–17 with 1:30 left in the fourth quarter.

The Patriots had no timeouts left for their ensuing drive, which resulted in color commentator John Madden initially suggesting that the Patriots should run out the clock and attempt to win in overtime. Instead, New England attempted to get the winning score in regulation on the final drive. Brady opened the drive with three completions to running back J.R. Redmond, which moved the ball to their 41-yard line with 33 seconds left. After an incomplete pass, Brady completed a clutch 23-yard pass to wide receiver Troy Brown, and followed it up with a 6-yard completion to tight end Jermaine Wiggins to advance to the Rams' 30-yard line. Brady then spiked the ball with seven seconds left, which set up Vinatieri's 48-yard field goal attempt. Vinatieri's game-winning kick was successful, marking the first time in Super Bowl history that a game was won by a score on the final play.

Notes and references

Further reading

External links
Season page on Pro Football Reference

New England Patriots
New England Patriots seasons
AFC East championship seasons
American Football Conference championship seasons
Super Bowl champion seasons
New England Patriots
Sports competitions in Foxborough, Massachusetts